Sirius XM Pops is a Sirius XM Satellite Radio online station devoted to popular classical music. It was formerly available on XM channel 75 (previously 77), Sirius channel 75 (previously 79). Until February 9, 2010, it was heard on Direct TV channel 866. Preston Trombly, Paul Bachmann, Vincent Caruso, Martin Goldsmith, Carol Ford and Lauren Rico were the channel's principal on-air voices.

The channel launched on XM in 2001 as XM Pops on channel 113. It moved to its channel number 77 and acquired its current name after merging with the SIRIUS Pops channel on November 12, 2008. It also acquired the same logo from its old Sirius counterpart. In addition, it is the only Sirius XM classical channel that was XM-exclusive until the channel merger. On Sirius Canada, the channel retains the Sirius Pops name.

On July 10, 2014, Sirius XM announced that Sirius XM Pops was to be removed from broadcast service on July 17. On July 17, 2014, at 12:00 a.m. Eastern, Sirius XM terminated broadcasting the Sirius XM Pops channel during a performance of Brahms' Hungarian Dance No. 5 just after playing Beethoven's Symphony No. 9 in D Minor. Sirius XM Pops programming has merged with Symphony Hall. However, Sirius XM Pops remains as an online-only station at channel 755.

Holiday Pops

The channel was pre-empted each year for a "Holiday Pops" format featuring vocal and instrumental Christmas music. This format change generally ran from shortly after Thanksgiving weekend through Christmas Day. However, beginning in 2014 with the relegation of Sirius XM pops to an online only station, Holiday Pops was also relegated to an online-only channel except for a short period beginning December 24 through Christmas Day, where it preempts the regular Symphony Hall programming on Satellite service. Its new number is online channel 783 and usually airs from the first Monday in December until Christmas Day. Since 2014 it is now completely separate from Sirius XM Pops which also continues to air online during the full run of Holiday Pops. The regular Symphony Hall programming airs online only on Christmas Eve and Christmas Day when Holiday Pops takes its place on the satellite service.

In 2018, "Holiday Pops" aired online throughout the season starting in November.

Pops On Film
Pops On Film was a specialty weekend program hosted and produced by Vincent Caruso. It aired Friday nights and was repeated Saturday nights and focused on film soundtrack and video game music suitable for a classical music and classical 'pops' music format. It ended when Sirius XM Pops was removed from broadcast service on July 17, 2014. The show was transitioned to SiriusXM's SymphonyHall (Channel 76) and renamed as "Classics On Film", with Vincent Caruso continuing to host and produce the show.

References

See also
List of Sirius Satellite Radio stations
List of XM Satellite Radio channels

Sirius Satellite Radio channels
XM Satellite Radio channels
Sirius XM Radio channels
Classical music radio stations in the United States
Radio stations established in 2001